Carl Peters is a 1941 German historical drama film directed by Herbert Selpin and starring Hans Albers, Karl Dannemann, and Fritz Odemar. It was produced as an anti-British propaganda film during the Second World War.

Albers portrays the titular German colonial leader.   Bayume Mohamed Husen plays his native guide.

The art director Fritz Maurischat worked on the film's sets. It was shot at the Bavaria Studios in Munich and the Barrandov Studios in Prague.

Synopsis
The film is a biopic of Carl Peters, one of the founders of German East Africa and takes place while he is under investigation by the Reichstag for unnecessary brutality. Instead, Peters openly calls for a global policy of colonialism and conquest, which he says will require issuing carte blanche to hard-hearted men like himself. He defends his policy of using execution without trial to prevent a native uprising, which, he insists, the parliamentarians could not have prevented. The parliamentarians, who are all depicted as Jews, refuse to accept this explanation, demonstrating the alleged dangers of democracy, constitutional monarchy, and all other political systems in which the Fuhrer principle is ignored.

Context in Nazi propaganda
This film is intended to provoke renewed anger over the Versailles Treaty: as the Kaiser's German colonial empire, the third largest the world has ever seen, had been divided up between the victorious Allies after World War I. The film's somewhat crude attack on the British Empire is typical of later films, such as Ohm Krüger, which were made after Hitler came to the conclusion that no separate peace with Britain was possible. Ironically, though, the British colonial officials are depicted far more sympathetically than the civil service and elected politicians of the German Empire, who fired Carl Peters.

Plot 
The story begins in London in 1892. Members of the British civil service in a club discuss Carl Peters, who has just crossed the English Channel with intelligence officers, wondering whether to stop Peters before he tries to achieve his objective and consolidate the position of the German Empire in East Africa.

Carl Peters returns to Germany to garner support, but his exploration projects are met with little response. He left on his own for Africa; arrived in Zanzibar, where he tries to convince the German consulate to support his effort. He intends to establish a colony and make it a protectorate of the imperial government. Peters concludes commercial treaties with local tribal leaders, before the British or the Belgians manage to do so.

Carl Peters then survives a tropical disease and an attempted poisoning from the Intelligence Service. He finally receives a letter from Kaiser Wilhelm I assuring protection for his colony.

Carl Peters returns to Africa and suffers through various trials, not only from the British, but also from the director of the Colonial Department of the German Foreign Office, who happens to be Jewish.  Carl Peters escapes danger, but his friend Karl Ludwig Jühlke is a victim. While Peters leads his expedition to an end, bad news reaches Berlin. Chancellor Bismarck must resign, but Peters is appointed Reichskommissar (Commissioner of Colonies). Back in Berlin, however, Peters must answer to the German people's elected representatives in the Reichstag and to respond to accusations of brutality by the Social Democratic Party of Germany (SPD). Despite the support of a witness in his favour, who is none other than a black Anglican Bishop, and despite the heated rhetoric that Peters uses, he is forced to resign.

Cast

References

Bibliography

External links

1941 films
1940s biographical films
1940s historical adventure films
German biographical films
German historical adventure films
Films of Nazi Germany
1940s German-language films
Films directed by Herbert Selpin
Films with screenplays by Ernst von Salomon
Nazi propaganda films
Films set in Tanzania
Films set in London
Films set in the 1880s
Films set in the 1890s
Bavaria Film films
Films shot at Barrandov Studios
Films shot at Bavaria Studios
German black-and-white films